The 2015 season is Tromsø's first season back in the Tippeligaen following their relegation in 2013, their 28th season in the top flight of Norwegian football and their second full season with Steinar Nilsen as their manager.

Squad 
.

Transfers

Winter

In:

Out:

Summer

In:

Out:

Competitions

Tippeligaen

Results summary

Results by round

Results

Table

Norwegian Cup

Squad statistics

Appearances and goals

|-
|colspan="14"|Players away from Tromsø on loan:
|-
|colspan="14"|Players who appeared for Tromsø no longer at the club:

|}

Goal scorers

Disciplinary record

References

Tromsø IL seasons
Tromsø